Ernie Ball (born Roland Sherwood Ball; August 30, 1930 – September 9, 2004) was an American entrepreneur and musician who developed guitar-related products. Ball began as a club and local television musician and entrepreneur, building an international business in guitars and accessories that would eventually gross US$40 million a year.  "Ernie Ball" is also the eponymous corporation Ball started to market guitar accessories.

Early years
Ball was born Roland Sherwood Ball in Santa Monica, California, and grew up in a musical family, the son of Frances (née Shankland) and Roland Adelbert Ball. His paternal grandfather, Ernest Ball, wrote the standard "When Irish Eyes Are Smiling" and his father was a car salesman who taught Hawaiian steel guitar on the side. Although Ball began to play steel guitar at age nine to please his father, he lost interest for several years. In his early teens he took a renewed interest in the instrument, practicing as many as three hours a day. Within a year he was a member of the Musicians Union.

Musician
While still in his early teens, Ball began playing professionally in South Central Los Angeles beer bars. By age 19 he joined the Tommy Duncan Band playing pedal steel guitar. Duncan, the former lead singer with Bob Wills and His Texas Playboys, took the band on tour through the Southwestern United States. During the Korean War, he did a tour of duty in the United States Air Force Band, playing guitar and bass drum. After the military he returned to Los Angeles and continued playing in barrooms and lounges, until landing a job on the 1950s "Western Varieties" program at KTLA television. The position soon gained him wider recognition in the Los Angeles music scene and led to studio work and teaching jobs.

Entrepreneur
Sometime in 1957 or 1958, Ball opened what was arguably the first music store in the United States to sell guitars exclusively, in Tarzana, California. When music sales representatives criticized him for refusing to sell drumsticks and other musical equipment, Ball replied, "I just want to sell guitars." He was repeatedly told that a guitar store would never be a success, but the words rang hollow as people began to come from miles around to visit the shop. Within the next couple years he opened 2 other shops, one in Canoga Park, CA, the other in Thousand Oaks, CA Eventually, the products spawned from his company would sell in more than 5,500 stores and be exported to more than 70 countries of the world.

"Slinkys"
With the guitar-based rock revival of the 1960s, Ball noticed that beginner students were having difficulty playing the bestselling Fender #10 medium gauge strings, particularly in holding down or bending the stiff .028" third ("G") string. At the time, it was common for a set of strings to have a third string that was "wound". He approached the Fender company with the problem, suggesting a lighter gauge, but was rebuffed. Ball convinced a string manufacturer to make him custom sets with a 24-gauge third string which he sold in his store. It was the beginning of the Ernie Ball brand. Located not far from Hollywood, the store began to attract a large patronage of professional musicians, including The Beach Boys, Merle Travis, and The Ventures.

Ball also began to notice the practice of "slack stringing" among players who discarded the bottom sixth string and added a banjo first string on top. This resulted in an overall lighter gauge set with a plain third string. Again, he contacted Fender with a suggestion for a lighter set and was turned down. He then approached Gibson, who also turned him down. So, once again he ordered from the manufacturer naming the product the Ernie Ball Slinky. "Slinky" strings traveled the country with the pro musicians who used them and before long, Ball was receiving mail orders from individuals and stores. Still not a string company, he ordered separate strings in various sizes and displayed them in a makeshift case allowing musicians to experiment in creating their own sets. It took off, and in 1967 he sold the store and moved his string business to Newport Beach, California.

Today Ernie Ball Slinkys are used by many world-famous guitar players, including Jimmy Page, Paul McCartney, Angus Young, Keith Richards, and Joe Bonamassa.

The characteristic packaging of Ball's guitar strings was designed by Rolly Crump, a Disney Imagineer.

Marketing innovation
Ernie Ball did not create anything new — he saw a demand and improved upon existing products and found ways to better fulfill market demands. By the early 1970s he took the company global by establishing distributors in Europe and Asia. Jimi Hendrix, Eric Clapton, Pete Townshend, and other rock icons began to make use of Slinkys, a trend that continues into the present, making Ernie Ball the second biggest string manufacturer in the country. He was unorthodox in his management methods, disregarding market surveys, preferring instead to test products in the marketplace to see if they would succeed. He regarded profit-and-loss as necessary evils and trusted his instincts. In the early eighties the company bought the Music Man Company, expanding into the production of high quality guitars, basses, and amplifiers with Leo Fender making the instruments and Tom Walker building amps. Ball, along with former Fender employee, George Fullerton, was instrumental in the development of the first modern acoustic bass guitar, introduced under the Earthwood brand in 1972. Although unsuccessful, surviving models are highly collectable.
 
In 1985, the company was moved to a new facility in San Luis Obispo and remained there with all of it operations until early 2003, when the company relocated its string manufacturing to Coachella in Southern California’s Riverside County. Under Ball's leadership, it grossed more than $40 million per annum. The company established an annual Battle of the Bands contest and participated in other trade events nationwide.

Battle of the Bands
In 1997, the very first Ernie Ball Battle of the Bands kicked off at the San Francisco date of the Warped Tour.  The Battle of The Bands 1 had 18 stops in its first year and developed into a long-lasting relationship with Kevin Lyman and the Warped Tour. Starting in 2000, Sterling Ball partnered with Chris Robinson VP of Electro Voice to promote the growth of the tour. In 2016, the Ernie Ball Battle of the Bands was rebranded to Ernie Ball: PLAY Warped. The 2016 marked the 20th anniversary of the Ernie Ball/Warped Tour Battle of the Bands relationship.

Ernie Ball: The Pursuit of Tone 
In 2016, Ernie Ball created, produced, and launched Ernie Ball: The Pursuit of Tone, a documentary series on the now defunct AT&T Audience Network that focused on the careers of a few well-known guitarists, including Buddy Guy, Mike Ness (Social Distortion), Billy Duffy (The Cult), Tom Delonge (Blink-182, Box Car Racer, Angels and Airwaves), James Valentine (Maroon 5) and Hunter Hayes.

Ernie Ball: String Theory 
In 2016, Ernie Ball launched Ernie Ball: String Theory, a web series that focuses on how today's top guitarists and bassists came to play the specific alloy(s) and gauge(s) of guitar strings that help them achieve their signature sounds. Artists have included Kirk Hammett (Metallica), Justin Chancellor (TOOL), Joe Bonamassa, Courtney Barnett, Paul Gilbert (Mr. Big, Racer X), Kenny Wayne Shepherd, Mike Herrera (MxPx), Steve Stevens (Billy Idol), Butch Walker, Bobb Bruno (Best Coast), Dustin Kensrue (Thrice), Joe Don Rooney (Rascal Flatts), Ilan Rubin (Nine Inch Nails, Angels and Airwaves, The New Regime), The White Buffalo, and more.

Personal life
Ball had diverse interests including collecting cars, surfing and flying airplanes. He also authored a series of books and manuals on guitar playing. He was married to Nova Gail (Conley), and had four children: Sherwood Ball, the ex-husband of actress Susan Anspach, David Ball, Sterling Ball, and Nova Ball. His granddaughter is actress Hannah Marks.

Death
Ball remained active in his company until his death 42 years after its founding. He died from an ongoing, undisclosed illness on September 9, 2004, leaving the business to his sons and other family members. He was buried near his home at San Luis Cemetery in San Luis Obispo, California.

See also
 Michael DeTemple

References

External links
  Ernie ball strings shop
 
 Ernie Ball/Music Man Company
 Ernie Ball Battle of the Bands
 Guitar Player story Captured 7 April 2007

1930 births
2004 deaths
American classical guitarists
American male guitarists
Pedal steel guitarists
Businesspeople from California
20th-century classical musicians
20th-century American guitarists
20th-century American male musicians
20th-century American businesspeople